William de Whithurst (died after 1350) was an English Crown official, who held office as a judge in Ireland.

He appears to have been a native of Gloucester, where he was the tenant of lands formerly held by William de Holyns. He was a clerk in the  English Chancery by the mid-1320s, and he was said to have given "long and faithful service" to the Crown.

The best evidence for his activities before 1346 lies in two petitions dating from 1331. William petitioned King Edward III for relief against being distrained by the Exchequer for debts owed to the Crown by the late Edmund, Earl of Kent, the King's uncle, of whose property he had been appointed Keeper, claiming that he had a letter under the Privy Seal discharging him from liability for the debt; an endorsement on the petition shows that this plea was accepted. He also petitioned to be cleared of liability for a sum of £100 given to him by the late King Edward II, during the conflict which led to King Edward's final downfall in 1327, to pay the wages of the soldiers at Gloucester, on the ground that he could produce no written evidence as to whether or not the wages had actually been paid since he had given the money to one Simon de Reading.

In 1346, in consideration of his good service, King Edward III appointed him Master of the Rolls in Ireland; he served until about 1350 when he returned to England to become the parish priest of Brixham, Devon. The Patent Rolls for 1349 record a debt of forty shillings owed to him by William de Wode, which was to be levied in Northampton.

References
Ball, F. Elrington  The Judges in Ireland 1221-1921 John Murray London 1926
Calendar of the Close Rolls Preserved in the Public Record Office
Dodd, Gwilym  Justice and Grace- Private Petitioning and the English Parliament in the Late Middle Ages Oxford University Press  2007
National Archives Ref. SC8/239/11922

People from Gloucester
Masters of the Rolls in Ireland